Pedro José Borrell Bentz (born in Puerto Plata, Dominican Republic  October 6, 1944) is an internationally recognized Dominican architect and archeologist who has earned several awards and is recognized for the transcendence in his architectural designs.

Biography 
Pedro José Borrell was born in Puerto Plata, Dominican Republic on October 6, 1944. His parents were Agustín Borrell Hungría (the son of José Ramón Borrell Arché, of Catalan and French descent, and Ana Joaquina Hungría Valdez) and Rosa Bentz de Ferrari (daughter of Rodolfo Tomás Bentz Hachtmann, who was born to German parents, and Margarita Ana Francisca de Ferrari, a native from Santa Margherita Ligure in northern Italy). He graduated with a degree in arts from the National School of Fine Arts in Santiago and later in architecture from the University of Santo Domingo in 1967. From 1967 to 1971 he was director of the Planning Office for the Universidad Católica Madre y Maestra. From 1971 going forward, Borrell has been devoted in the field of architecture and construction with distinguished contributions in the fields of photography, underwater archeology and environmental conservatism.

Among his most notable architectural works are the National Aquarium, Headquarters for Banco Popular Dominicano, Juan Pablo Duarte Government Building (El Huacal) and Novo Mundo XXI, a coastal reclamation project which will be hosted by a million square meters on the Caribbean Sea, along the waterfront of Santo Domingo.

In pursuit of his interests of underwater archaeology and conservation he has been Executive Director of the Underwater Archeological Rescue Committee since 1979, responsible for rescuing national heritage immersed in the remains of ancient shipwrecks off the Dominican Republic’s coast. His experience in this field has prompted him to write several books and articles on the subject which have been published both nationally and internationally.

He has written articles in Geomundo, Unesco's Museum Magazine and in Dominican News Paper Listín Diario. Has also published several books: Arqueología Submarina en la República Dominicana, Planificación Física de la Pontificia Universidad Catolica Madre y Maestra y Rescate del Galeón Concepción. He is also co-author of Navegantes y Náufragos and co-editor of La Aventura del Guadalupe, both published in Madrid, Spain and Novo Mundo XXI, a coastal reclamation project which will be hosted by a million square meters on the Caribbean Sea, along the waterfront of Santo Domingo.

Notable Works 
 
 Mall Galería 360 (Santo Domingo, Dominican Republic), 2010
 Cerarte's Eastern Branch (Punta Cana, Dominican Republic), 2009
 La Altagracia Museum (Higüey, Dominican Republic), 2009
 Playa Turquesa Project (Bávaro, Dominican Republic), 2006
 Stanza Mare Project (Bávaro, Dominican Republic), 2004
 Novo Mundo XXI (Santo Domingo, Dominican Republic), 2003
 Centro León (Santiago, Dominican Republic), 2000
 Santo Domingo's National Aquarium (Dominican Republic), 1986
 Headquarters for Banco Popular Dominicano (Santo Domingo, Dominican Republic), 1990
 Barceló Tambor Beach Hotel (Bahía Ballena, Costa Rica), 1992
 Master Plan Facenda (Brazil), 2008
 Americana Hardware Store (Santo Domingo, Dominican Republic), 1995
 Headquarters for Group León Jimenes (Santo Domingo, Dominican Republic), 2000
 Nestlé Headquarters (Santo Domingo, Dominican Republic), 1997
 Government Building Juan Pablo Duarte (Santo Domingo, Dominican Republic), 1971

Titles 

 1967-1971 Director of the Office of Physical Planning of the Universidad Catolica Madre y Maestra
 1968 Founder of the famed photo group “Jueves 68”
 1975 Founder of Underwater Research Group (GIS)
 1979-2000 Led the Submarine Archaeological Rescue Committee
 1990 Director of the Office of Underwater Cultural Heritage
 
 1992 Commissioner of the Dominican Republic to the Italian government at the show "Christopher Columbus: The ship and the Sea"
 1994 - 1996 Member of the Committee of eco-tourism from the Secretary of State for Tourism
 2002 Delegate to Congress of the International Union of Architects in Madrid, Spain.
 2004 Delegate to the XIII Pan American Congress of Architects in San Juan, Puerto Rico.

Awards 

 1967 Award for best student in architecture awarded by CODIA
 1972 Highest Silver Prize of the Jaycees
 1990 The Dominican Society of Architects selected "20 Paradigms Buildings in the Dominican Republic in the 20th century”, two of which were designed by Borrell
 1992 The Dominican Chamber of Construction awarded the prize "Work most Technologically advanced for its time" for the design and construction of the National Aquarium
 1993 The Scientific Community Loyola (COMCIL) awarded the Loyola Prize for his scientific contributions to the national community
 1994 His name appears in "International Who's Who in art and antiques"
 1997 One of the Dominicans included in "One Thousand Profiles of the World"

Contests 

 1970 Duarte Market  (2nd)
 1971 Government office Buildings (1st )
 1974 Dominican College of Engineers and Architects (1st)
 1974 Olympic Cycle Track (2nd)
 1974 Olympic Stadium (3rd)
 1976 Mortgage Bank (2nd)
 1976 Health Center Hato Mayor (1st)
 1977 Golf Villas, Dorado Beach (3rd)
 1979 Santo Domingo Country Club (2nd)
 1981 Villas Portillo Hotel (1st)
 1988 Rosario Dominicana Building (2nd)
 1990 Financial  Headquarters Building, (1st)
 1996 Universal Insurance Headquarters(1st)
 2000 Hotel Casa del Mar in Casa de Campo (1st)

Sources

External links
 Official website

Dominican Republic architects
Dominican Republic people of Catalan descent
Dominican Republic people of French descent
Dominican Republic people of German descent
Dominican Republic people of Italian descent
Living people
1944 births